Chaâbane Meftah (born March 3, 1990) is an Algerian football player. He is currently unattached.

Personal
Meftah was born in Tizi Ouzou. He comes from a long family of footballers, with three of his cousins having already played for JS Kabylie: Mahieddine Meftah, Mohamed Rabie Meftah and Rahim Meftah. Two of them, Mahieddine and Rabie, also played for the Algerian National Team. Another cousin, Jugurtha Meftah, is also a footballer and currently plays for JS Kabylie as well.

Club career
On June 14, 2011, Meftah made his professional debut for JS Kabylie in a league match against WA Tlemcen.

In the summer of 2012, Meftah signed a two-year contract with WA Tlemcen. However, he was released before the start of the season.

References

External links
 

1990 births
Living people
Algerian footballers
Algerian Ligue Professionnelle 1 players
JS Kabylie players
Kabyle people
Footballers from Tizi Ouzou
Association football defenders
21st-century Algerian people